Soksom (Dzongkha: སོག་སོགམ་; Wylie: sog-sogm) is a traditional Bhutanese sport.

References

Further reading

Sport in Bhutan
Sports originating in Bhutan